Saint Nicasius of Rouen (d. perhaps  260), often known as the Apostle of the Vexin, was a 3rd-century saint and martyr in Gaul. He is sometimes considered the first Bishop of Rouen, although probably incorrectly.

Life
Nicasius evangelized the Vexin, although he was apparently never in Rouen and despite tradition, was probably never bishop there.  He spent a year at Mousseaux and evangelized Rolleboise nearby. He performed several miracles and evangelized numerous places along the Seine (among them Conflans, Andrésy, Triel, Vaux, Meulan, Mantes and La Roche-Guyon) but was martyred with his companions on the banks of the Epte in Gasny before reaching Rouen. He was believed to have been buried in Gasny.

Saint Mellon, possibly the next bishop, is traditionally said to be a disciple of Nicasius.

Cultus
Nicasius is a saint, listed in the Roman Martyrology on 11 October, his feast day. He is represented in art as a cephalophore, referring to his martyrdom, and as a bishop.

References

Sources
 Sanctoral.com: Saint Nicaise et ses Compagnons

See also
 Nicasius, Quirinus, Scubiculus, and Pientia

French Roman Catholic saints
3rd-century births
3rd-century bishops in Gaul
3rd-century Christian martyrs
Cephalophores
Gallo-Roman saints